John Yurkow an American college baseball coach, currently serving as head coach of the Penn Quakers baseball program.  He was named to that position prior to the 2014 season.

Raised in Washington Township, Gloucester County, New Jersey, Yurkow attended Gloucester Catholic High School.

Yurkow played second base at Rowan University, and earned his first coaching position with the Profs immediately after graduation.  He served two years before moving to Duke for four seasons.  He then accepted a position at Penn as the top assistant to head coach John Cole, who had previously coached him at Rowan.  Upon Cole's firing after the 2013 seasons, Yurkow was elevated to the head coaching position.

Head coaching record
Below is a table of Yurkow's yearly records as an NCAA head baseball coach.

See also
List of current NCAA Division I baseball coaches

References

Living people
Baseball players from New Jersey
Baseball second basemen
Duke Blue Devils baseball coaches
Gloucester Catholic High School alumni
Penn Quakers baseball coaches
People from Washington Township, Gloucester County, New Jersey
Rowan Profs baseball coaches
Rowan Profs baseball players
Sportspeople from Gloucester County, New Jersey
Year of birth missing (living people)
Baseball coaches from New Jersey